James Leslie Sean Beattie (born October 26, 1948) was a Canadian politician. He served in the Legislative Assembly of British Columbia from 1991 to 1996, as a NDP member for the constituency of Okanagan-Penticton.

References

1948 births
British Columbia New Democratic Party MLAs
Living people
Politicians from Hamilton, Ontario